Sainte-Marie-Madeleine is a parish municipality in southwestern Quebec, Canada, in Les Maskoutains Regional County Municipality. The population as of the Canada 2011 Census was 2,935.

Demographics 

See also
List of parish municipalities in Quebec

References

Parish municipalities in Quebec
Incorporated places in Les Maskoutains Regional County Municipality